The National Rookie League (NRL) was an American unaffiliated minor league for the National Basketball Association that completed its first and only season in 2001.

The NRL was exclusive to players under the age of 24 and was designed to help prepare the nation's most talented young athletes for a professional basketball career.

The 2001 season began with five teams: Baltimore Blaze, Delaware Destroyers, Gotham City Knights, Philadelphia Force and Washington Justice. After four games, Gotham City disbanded. On August 9, 2001, the Blaze defeated the Force 100–93 in the NRL Championship Game.

References

External links
 Official page
 Team profile on USBasket.com website

Sports leagues disestablished in 2001
Defunct basketball leagues in the United States
Sports leagues established in 2001
2001 establishments in the United States
2001 disestablishments in the United States